Bitoy's Funniest Videos is a Philippine television comedy show broadcast by GMA Network. Hosted by Michael V., it premiered on July 3, 2004. The show concluded on October 10, 2009 with a total of 271 episodes.

Hosts

Michael V.

Co-hosts
 Toni Gonzaga
 Karel Marquez
 K Brosas
Yasmien Kurdi
Michelle Madrigal
Katrina Halili
Pauleen Luna
Jennylyn Mercado
Iwa Moto
Kris Bernal
Jewel Mische
Daiana Menezes

Home media release
The series was released on DVD in 2008 by GMA Records. The DVD contained "the best of the best" episodes of Yari Ka! throughout the years.

Ratings
According to AGB Nielsen Philippines' Mega Manila household television ratings, the final episode of Bitoy's Funniest Videos scored a 17.2% rating.

References

External links
 

2004 Philippine television series debuts
2009 Philippine television series endings
Filipino-language television shows
GMA Network original programming
Philippine comedy television series
Video clip television series